Colonel Rajyavardhan Singh Rathore, (born 29 January 1970) is an Indian politician, Olympic medallist, former shooting athlete and retired Indian Army officer. Rathore is a Member of Parliament in the 17th Lok Sabha from Jaipur Rural seat.

He won 25 international medals at various championships for Double Trap Shooting including a silver medal at 2004 Summer Olympics in Men's Double Trap event.

Rathore served as a commissioned officer in The Grenadiers regiment of the Indian Army before retiring in 2013 as a colonel. Following his retirement from the army and shooting, he became the member of the parliament for the Bharatiya Janata Party in 2014.

In November 2014, was made the Minister of State for Information and Broadcasting. Rathore served as a Cabinet minister with independent charge for Ministry of Youth Affairs and Sports from 2017 until 2019.

Personal life
Rathore was born in Jaisalmer, Rajasthan to Colonel Lakshman Singh Rathore (Retd.) and Manju Rathore on 29 January 1970.

His educational qualifications include B.A., Instructor-Weapons (MMG, AGL, Small Arms), Grading Tactics (YO) Course. He was educated at the National Defence Academy, Pune and Infantry School, Mhow.

He married Gayatri Rathore on 16 February 1997, she is a doctor by profession in the Indian Army. They have a son and a daughter.

Military career
Rathore is a graduate of the 77th Course of the National Defence Academy. After graduating from the NDA, Rathore attended the Indian Military Academy where he was awarded the Sword of Honor for the best all-round Gentleman Cadet. He was also the recipient of the Sikh Regiment Gold Medal, awarded to the best sportsman of the course.

He was later commissioned in the 9th Grenadiers (Mewar) Regiment on 15 December 1990. He was promoted to lieutenant on 15 December 1992 and to captain on 15 December 1995. Rathore fought in the Kargil War, and was promoted to major on 15 December 2000. As part of his career in the Indian Army, he served in Jammu and Kashmir, where he participated in counter-terrorist operations. His regiment was awarded the Army Chief's Citation and the Governor of J&K's Citation for exemplary work. He was promoted to lieutenant-colonel on 16 December 2004, and to his final rank of colonel on 1 May 2009.

Sports career
At the 2002 Commonwealth Games in Manchester, Rathore won a gold medal and set a new Commonwealth Games Record of 192 targets out of 200, which still stands. He also won the Team Gold Medal along with Moraad Ali Khan. Rathore, went on to successfully defend his Commonwealth Champion title by winning the gold medal at the Melbourne Commonwealth Games in 2006. He also won the silver in the Team event with Vikram Bhatnagar. He won gold medals in two World Shooting Championships, at Sydney in 2004 and Cairo in 2006.

Rathore rose to prominence when he won the silver at the 2004 Athens Olympics. It was India's first ever individual silver at the Olympics.

In 2006, Rathore won a bronze medal in the World Championship in Spain, an event held for the top 12 shooters of the world. He was ranked third in the world for the most of 2003 and 2004 and briefly climbed to the first in early 2004 and second after the Athens Olympics. He won a silver at the World Championship in 2003 in Sydney for India after a gap of nearly 40 years. India had not seen a victory since Karni Singh of Bikaner, who won a silver at the 1962 World shooting Championship in Cairo. Rathore is credited with winning the Asian Clay Target gold medal four times in a row from 2003 to 2006. He also holds an Individual bronze medal which was at the Asian Games 2006 in Doha.

Between 2002 and 2006 he won 25 international medals at various championships for Double Trap.

In 2011, Rathore participated in the Asian Clay Target Championship in Kuala Lumpur and won gold. His score of 194 in that tournament equals world record.

Political career
On 10 September 2013, Rathore joined Bharatiya Janata Party after taking retirement from the Indian Army. He was elected as an MP in the 2014 Lok Sabha election from Jaipur Rural constituency. On 9 November 2014, he was sworn-in as the Minister of State for Information & Broadcasting, under the Narendra Modi government.
 He was appointed the Minister of Sports on 3 September 2017. In May 2018, he became Minister of State (I/C) for Information & Broadcasting.

Awards and recognitions

 2005 – Padma Shri
 20042005 – the Major Dhyan Chand Khel Ratna Award (Highest Sporting Honour of India).
 20032004 – Arjuna Award
 Ati Vishisht Seva Medal (AVSM), military award for exceptional service, presented by the President of India on behalf of the Government of India. 
 Rathore was the chosen flag bearer for India during the 2008 Summer Olympics in Beijing, China.
 Rathore was the chosen flag bearer for India during the 2006 Commonwealth Games in Melbourne, Australia
 1990 – the Sword of Honour (For the Best All Round Officer Cadet at the Indian Military Academy).
 1990 – the Sikh Regiment Gold Medal (For the Best Sportsmen at the Indian Military Academy).
 1989 – the "Blazer" (Highest sports award at the National Defence Academy, Pune, India).

Military awards

References

External links
 "Rajyavardhan Singh Rathore", No 55 on Time's list of "100 Olympic Athletes To Watch"
 Weblog maintained by Rajyavardhan Singh Rathore for the 2008 Beijing Olympics
 Rajyavardhan Singh Rathore Images & Videos

|-

|-

1970 births
Living people
Indian male sport shooters
Olympic shooters of India
Olympic silver medalists for India
Commonwealth Games gold medallists for India
Rajasthani people
Shooters at the 2006 Commonwealth Games
Shooters at the 2004 Summer Olympics
Shooters at the 2008 Summer Olympics
Recipients of the Khel Ratna Award
Recipients of the Padma Shri in sports
Sport shooters from Rajasthan
Indian Army officers
Trap and double trap shooters
Recipients of the Arjuna Award
People from Jaisalmer district
Olympic medalists in shooting
Medalists at the 2004 Summer Olympics
Asian Games medalists in shooting
Shooters at the 1998 Asian Games
Shooters at the 2002 Asian Games
Shooters at the 2006 Asian Games
India MPs 2014–2019
Lok Sabha members from Rajasthan
Bharatiya Janata Party politicians from Rajasthan
Narendra Modi ministry
Asian Games silver medalists for India
Asian Games bronze medalists for India
Commonwealth Games silver medallists for India
People from Jaisalmer
Indian sportsperson-politicians
Commonwealth Games medallists in shooting
National Defence Academy (India) alumni
Medalists at the 2006 Asian Games
India MPs 2019–present
Medallists at the 2006 Commonwealth Games